Oxycodone/naloxone, sold under the brand names Targin and Targinact among others, is a combination pain medication. It is available as modified-release tablets and is taken by mouth.

The oxycodone component is an opioid and is responsible for the pain-relieving effects. Naloxone opposes the effects of opioids but is poorly absorbed into the body when given orally, meaning almost all the dose stays within the gastrointestinal tract and reduces the local side effects from the oxycodone, namely constipation as the naloxone binds to the opioid receptors in the gut, preventing the opioid from attaching. This does not affect its analgesic efficacy compared to Oxycontin. Constipation was significantly relieved in a 2008 study. The drug was released in 2006 in Germany and is available in some other European countries since 2009. In the UK, the 10 mg oxycodone / 5 mg naloxone and 20 mg/10 mg strengths were approved in December 2008, and the 40 mg/20 mg and 5 mg/10 mg strengths in July 2019.

Preliminary evidence suggests that oxycodone/naloxone may be an effective treatment for severe, refractory restless legs syndrome if first-line therapies have not been effective.

Adverse effects

If the drug is used off-label by crushing the tablet and dissolving it for injection, it may precipitate severe opiate withdrawal symptoms due to the much higher bioavailability of intravenous naloxone compared to oral naloxone. In simpler terms, the normal injection dose of naloxone is far smaller than the oral dose due to more of an intravenous dose being absorbed and active in the body.

References

External links 
 

Combination analgesics
Semisynthetic opioids